The National Children's Hospital was a children's teaching hospital in Dublin, Ireland. It was absorbed into the Tallaght Hospital in June 1998.

History
The hospital was founded by Sir Philip Crampton, Sir Henry Marsh and Dr Charles Johnston, on Pitt Street (now Balfe Street) in The Liberties as the Institute for Sick Children in 1821. Following amalgamation with the National Orthopaedic and Children's Hospital in 1884, the combined institution moved to Harcourt Street in 1887. It was absorbed into the Tallaght Hospital as its Children's Services Department in June 1998.

In November 2012 the Minister for Health James Reilly announced plans to transfer Children's Services from the Tallaght University Hospital to a new children's hospital on the campus of St. James's Hospital.

In November 2022, Taoiseach Mícheál Martin planted the first tree in the hospital's garden, and announced that, with the completion of the façade, the hospital was 80% completed.

References

Teaching hospitals in Dublin (city)
1839 establishments in Ireland
Hospitals established in 1839
Defunct hospitals in the Republic of Ireland
Children's hospitals in the Republic of Ireland
1998 disestablishments in Ireland
Hospitals disestablished in 1998